Kelvin John Coe  (born 1944) was the Mayor of Selwyn District in New Zealand from 2007 to 2016.

Early years

Coe was born in Lincoln. He attended Lincoln College (now known as Lincoln University), where he graduated with a Diploma in Valuation and Farm Management and a Bachelor of Commerce (Agriculture). Coe then spent three years working in Thailand with Volunteer Service Abroad in rural development work after which he returned to Irwell to farm a mixed sheep & cropping farm.

Local body politics
Before coming into local body politics Coe had long been involved in community groups – being a past Chairman of Leeston Consolidated Primary School Board of Trustees, a past President of Ellesmere Tennis Sub-Association and a past President of North Canterbury Federated Farmers. He was a government appointee to the Standards Association of NZ (second term as Deputy Chairman) and held directorships in Sicon (Council owned roading and service company) and Selwyn Investment Holdings Ltd.

Coe's emergence onto the political scene was in 1995 when he was elected as a councillor for the Selwyn District Council. He continued this role for four terms, holding the position of deputy mayor in the final term. In 2007 he stood for mayoralty against four candidates and was elected mayor of Selwyn on 13 October. Coe received 3,724 votes, followed by John Morten (2,618) and Debra Hasson (2,031). In October 2010 Coe was re-elected for a second term with 5,908 votes against former Selwyn mayor, Bill Woods (4,957).

During his second term as mayor, Coe saw the opening of the Selwyn Aquatic Centre in June 2013, the Lincoln Events Center in April 2011 and the completion of stage five of Izone Industrial Park in Rolleston.

In February 2013, Coe announced that he would stand for a third term in October. On 12 October he was elected from the pool of six candidates for his third term as mayor with 3185 votes, followed by ex-Canterbury District Health Board member Olive Webb (2709) and councillor Sam Broughton (2298). Coe announced that this would "most likely" be his final term.

Coe retired from office in October 2016 after completing his third term.

2010 and 2011 earthquakes
Mayor Coe was the mayor at the time of both the 2010 and 2011 Canterbury earthquakes. He was one of the seven commissioners in the Canterbury Earthquake Recovery Commission, and worked with Civil Defense and locals in the recovery process of the area.

Honours
Kelvin Coe was made an Officer of the New Zealand Order of Merit (ONZM) in 2017, for services to local government.

Personal life
Kelvin Coe is married to Gem Coe and together they have three daughters.

References

External links 
 , Good living, 9 September 2010.

1945 births
Living people
Lincoln University (New Zealand) alumni
People from Lincoln, New Zealand
Mayors of places in Canterbury, New Zealand
Deputy mayors of places in New Zealand
Officers of the New Zealand Order of Merit